Roy Leonard Hurley (August 12, 1922 – October 14, 1993) was an American professional basketball player. He spent two seasons in the National Basketball League (NBL) and one season in the Basketball Association of America (BAA). He played for the Indianapolis Kautskys (NBL, 1945–46), the Toronto Huskies (BAA, 1946–47), the Tri-Cities Blackhawks (NBL, 1947–48), and the Syracuse Nationals (NBL, 1947–48).

Hurley died on October 14, 1993.

BAA career statistics

Regular season

References

External links

1922 births
1993 deaths
American expatriate basketball people in Canada
American men's basketball players
Basketball players from California
Forwards (basketball)
Guards (basketball)
Indianapolis Kautskys players
People from Arcadia, California
Sportspeople from Los Angeles County, California
Syracuse Nationals players
Toronto Huskies players
Tri-Cities Blackhawks players
Undrafted National Basketball Association players